UPWARD was the code name, within the National Reconnaissance Office's Byeman Control System, for assistance given to the National Aeronautics and Space Administration (NASA) during Project Apollo. The camera designed to survey the lunar surface was a modification of the GAMBIT design and utilized a 1.5 inch focal length camera for a terrain mapping apparatus. This camera system was present on both the CORONA and GAMBIT survey systems.

The NRO and NASA had multiple meetings discussing the required technology for Lunar Mapping. Specifically, the NASA Apollo Applicant Working Group (dated on 6-9 Dec 1966) considered the following optical sensors:

 A camera from the unmanned lunar orbiter
 12-inch focal length panoramic camera
 The multi-spectral experiment reviewed earlier by the Department of Defense 
 6-inch focal length mapping camera
 Telescope using Questar lens (56-inch focal length) and with simplified tracking and focusing device
 An imaging radar

In a following meeting on 31 Jan 1967, NASA stated at the DoD-NASA Survey Applications Coordinating Committee that "there no sensors other than LM&SS for flight on AAP-1."

According to the NRO/NASA agreement, lunar photography could be sanitized by eliminating camera scale factors. The project had the unclassified name of Lunar Mapping and Survey System (LM&SS) in NASA channels.

The success of both Lunar Orbiter and Surveyor negated the use of the LM&SS system. There are no recorded spaceflights with these systems.

See also
Lunar Orbiter - used recycled technology from SAMOS (satellite)
KH-11
KH-10

References

Reconnaissance satellites of the United States